The short-clawed ctenotus (Ctenotus brachyonyx)  is a species of skink found in New South Wales, South Australia, and Victoria.

References

brachyonyx
Reptiles described in 1971
Taxa named by Glen Milton Storr